An autological word (also called homological word) is a word that expresses a property that it also possesses (e.g., "word" is a word, "noun" is a noun, "English" is an English word, "pentasyllabic" has five syllables, and "writable" is writable). The opposite is a heterological word, one that does not apply to itself (e.g. the word "long" is not long, "monosyllabic" has more than one syllable, "dactyl" is not a dactyl, and "misspelled" is not misspelled.)

Unlike more general concepts of autology and self-reference, this particular distinction and opposition of "autological" and "heterological words" is uncommon in linguistics for describing linguistic phenomena or classes of words, but is current in logic and philosophy where it was introduced by Kurt Grelling and Leonard Nelson for describing a semantic paradox, later known as Grelling's paradox or the Grelling–Nelson paradox.

See also 
 Self-reference
 Appendix:English autological terms on Wiktionary

References

Further reading 
 Volker Peckhaus: The Genesis of Grelling's Paradox, in: Ingolf Max / Werner Stelzner (eds.), Logik und Mathematik: Frege-Kolloquium Jena 1993, Walter de Gruyter, Berlin 1995 (Perspektiven der analytischen Philosophie, 5), pp. 269–280
 Simon Blackburn: The Oxford Dictionary of Philosophy, Oxford University Press, 2nd ed. Oxford 2005, p. 30 ("autological"), p. 170 ("heterological"), p. 156 ("Grelling's paradox")

External links 

 Henry Segerman: A list of autological words
 A brief look into the different types of autology by Ionatan Waisgluss

Self-reference
Words
Types of words
Semantics
Logic
Definition